The Embassy of India in Bratislava is the diplomatic mission of India to Slovakia. The ambassador is Mr. Vanlalhuma.

Events & Scholarships
The embassy encourages the locals to participate in various organised events, mostly cultural programs. Young students are offered scholarships for various programmes, like "Know India program", ICCR scholarship programmes, ITEC programmes, and Hindi language scholarships; usually for admissions in Hindi-taught institutions.

For the students who want to study in India for pursuing more studies, another admission scheme is run.

For Indian students who want to study in Slovakia, the embassy too, offers a scholarship programme.

See also
 India–Slovakia relations
 Foreign relations of Slovakia
 Foreign relations of India
 List of diplomatic missions in Slovakia
 List of diplomatic missions of India

References

External links
 
 Central Institute of Hindi
  for ICCR
  for ITEC

Slovakia
India
India–Slovakia relations